The Palestro-class ironclad floating batteries were four floating batteries built for the French Navy in 1859-62 to replace the Crimean War-built vessels because of fears that the 1855 ships would deteriorate because they had been built hurriedly with poor wood.

References

Bibliography

 

Ironclad floating batteries
Ironclad warships of the French Navy